Admission by Guts is a 2015 Chinese horror film directed by Ming Wang. It was released on June 19, 2015.

Cast
Xiaofan Lin
Yiqi Yao
Zhongwei Jiang
Ye Wang
Grace Qiu
Wenze Mei
Yuanyuan Zhao
Tu Hong
Qingbin Yu

Reception

Box office
The film earned  at the Chinese box office.

References

2015 horror films
Chinese horror films
Chinese zombie films